Fira OS is a Linux-based mobile operating system and software platform developed by Fira, a subsidiary of Indonesian electronic giant Polytron (member of Djarum Group). Introduced on January 28, 2016, it was forked from Android and installed on newer Polytron smartphones since 2016.

Overview
Fira OS is based on the Android Open Source Project (AOSP) and the Linux kernel. It was built to comply with an Indonesian regulation requiring 40% minimum local content on all 4G LTE smartphones sold in Indonesia starting in 2017.

Applications
Fira OS features applications that are not usually available in other AOSP-based operating systems, such as FIRA Check Pulsa, FIRA Store, FIRA Pay, FIRA Directory, and others.

References

Mobile software
Mobile operating systems